Patricia Franklin (born 11 September 1942) is an English actress best known for her roles in five Carry On films.

Early life
Born in East Finchley, London, Franklin and her family frequently went to see shows at the nearby amateur theatre and after seeing the theatre company, Mountview Academy of Theatre Arts,  offered drama classes, Franklin decided to join. After appearing in several productions, Franklin joined Royal Academy of Dramatic Art (RADA).

Career
Upon leaving RADA, Franklin's first acting role was as a hostess in an episode of At Last The 1948 Show in 1968. After this, she spent nine months in the West End in Uproar in the House with Joan Sims and Peter Butterworth.  The producer of the Carry On films Peter Rogers was in the audience as Sims and Butterworth were regulars in the series and offered Franklin a part in the next film which she accepted. Franklin's first film role was playing a farmer's daughter in Carry On Camping (1969) in several scenes depicting a series of mix-ups between her father (Derek Francis), Charles Hawtrey and Terry Scott.

Impressed with Franklin's performance in Carry On Camping, Rogers offered Franklin another role in his next film Carry On Again Doctor (1969) as a nurse although she had to turn it down as she was busy in a production of Edward Bond's play Saved at the Royal Court Theatre. In 1970, Franklin appeared in Carry On Loving in a scene with Bill Maynard as an incompatible married couple seeking advice from an incompetent marriage guidance counsellor (Kenneth Williams) before playing a woman arguing with Diana Coupland and Patsy Rowlands at a jumble sale in the film Bless This House (1972). Franklin followed this with her largest role in a Carry On film; as Rosemary, June Whitfield's right-hand woman in a Women's Liberation scheme to sabotage a beauty contest orchestrated by Sid James in an otherwise dull seaside town in Carry On Girls (1973).

After several television roles, including Fraud Squad, The Legend of Robin Hood, Centre Play and a part in the film Brief Encounter (1974), Franklin starred in Carry On Behind (1975) as the nagging wife of Jack Douglas who goes on a camping holiday with his friend Windsor Davies to escape their wives; the final scene depicts Franklin and Davies' wife Liz Fraser finding Douglas and Davies in a compromising position with two young scantily clad fellow campers played by Carol Hawkins and Sherrie Hewson. Franklin followed this with a role in an episode of The Sweeney entitled "Bad Apple" before making her final role in a Carry On film as a militant army cook in Carry On England (1976).

Franklin then went on to have several television credits include Play for Today, Black Books, Silent Witness and four episodes of The Bill. She later appeared in all three films in Edgar Wright's and Simon Pegg's Three Flavours Cornetto trilogy: Shaun of the Dead (2004), Hot Fuzz (2007) and World's End (2013). Since then, she has had many more roles including appearing in two episodes of The Alienist and starring in the Christmas film Jingle Jangle: A Christmas Journey (2020).

Personal life
Franklin is married to the Australian dramatist Frank Hatherley. Their youngest daughter is guitarist, composer and solo artist Charlotte Hatherley. Their oldest daughter is film composer Abigail Hatherley and their middle child is software entrepreneur, musician and philanthropist, Beatrice Hatherley.

Filmography

Film

Television

References

External links
 

1942 births
Living people
English film actresses
English television actresses
Actresses from London
20th-century English actresses
21st-century English actresses